Brady Heights is a historic district in Tulsa, Oklahoma that was listed on the U.S. National Register of Historic Places in 1980, as Brady Heights Historic District.  It was Tulsa's first district to be listed in the Register. According to the NRHP documentation, it is the most complete pre-1920 neighborhood surviving in Tulsa. Its boundaries are Marshall Street to the north, the alley between Cheyenne Avenue and Main Street on the east, Fairview Street on the south, and the Osage Expressway right-of-way on the west.  At listing, it included 250 contributing buildings.

From territorial days until the 1920s, Brady Heights was an important part of the then fashionable north side of Tulsa. Professionals and businessmen like G. Y. Vandever (owner of Vandever's department store), I. S. Mincks (initial owner of the Mincks-Adams Hotel), architect George Winkler and “Diamond Joe” Wilson, owned homes there.
The area derives its name from entrepreneur W. Tate Brady, who owned the land now covered by the addition which bears his name. Many architectural styles have influenced the design of Brady Heights. Architects and builders used elements of Queen Anne, Prairie School, Victorian, Georgian Revival and Bungalow styles. Wood and brick are the most common exterior materials. The houses of Brady Heights are on a larger scale and of a more sophisticated design than those of adjacent neighborhoods. Bay windows with leaded glass, servants’ quarters, and broad porches suggest the elegance of earlier days.

The development differs from later Tulsa neighborhoods in that it is more eclectic.  The district also includes two Dutch Colonial houses and a 1920 neoclassic mansion.

It was listed under National Register Criteria C, for its architecture.

References

External links
Brady Heights Historic District, at Tulsa Preservation Commission
Brady Heights Neighborhood Association

Neighborhoods in Tulsa, Oklahoma
Houses on the National Register of Historic Places in Oklahoma
Neoclassical architecture in Oklahoma
Prairie School architecture in Oklahoma
Bungalow architecture in Oklahoma
Historic districts on the National Register of Historic Places in Oklahoma
Houses in Tulsa County, Oklahoma
National Register of Historic Places in Tulsa, Oklahoma